John Rogan (1868–1905) was the second tallest person in history and the tallest person of African descent.

John or Johnny Rogan may also refer to:
 John Rogan (actor) (1938–2017), Irish actor
 John Rogan (Canadian football) (born 1960), Canadian football player
 John P. Rogan, American archaeologist
 Johnny Rogan (1953–2021), English author
 John "Jack" Rogan, founder of Rogan's Shoes